Howard Smith may refer to:

Companies 
 Howard Smith Limited, former Australian industrial company

Government and politics 
 Howard Alexander Smith (1880–1966), U.S. Senator from New Jersey
 Howard E. Smith (Minnesota politician) (1917–2011), American businessman and Minnesota state legislator
 Howard W. Smith (1883–1976), U.S. Representative from Virginia
 Howard Smith (diplomat) (1919–1996), British ambassador and Director General of MI5, 1979–1981

Arts and entertainment 
 Howard Smith (actor) (1893–1968), American actor
 Howard Smith (director) (1936–2014), American film director, journalist and broadcaster
 Howie Smith (born 1943), musician
 Howard Everett Smith (1885–1970), American painter

Other 
 Howard Alan Smith, astrophysicist and author
 Howard Bradley Smith (1894–?), American author
 Howard Dwight Smith (1886–1958), American architect
 Howard K. Smith (1914–2002), American journalist
 Howard Smith (footballer) (1878–1909), Australian footballer for St Kilda
 Howard Van Smith (1909–1987), American journalist
 Howard Smith (bobsleigh) (born 1956), British Olympic bobsledder